Everybody Needs a Little Help was David Meece's third album, currently out-of-print.

Track listing 

All songs written by David Meece, except where noted.

Side 1
"I Can't Believe It's True" - 2:59
"God Holds The Future" (Meece, Brown Bannister) - 3:56
"Never Gonna Serve Anyone Else" - 3:16
"Everybody Needs A Little Help" - 3:52
"All The Time" - 4:26

Side 2
"Love Is The Reason (We're Here Tonight)" - 3:58
"All I Can Do" - 3:00
"Sunshine Jesus" - 2:53
"Oh, So Wonderful" - 3:42
"He'll Take Care Of You" - 2:55

Personnel 
 David Meece – lead vocals, backing vocals, keyboards 
 Shane Keister – keyboards 
 Bobby Ogdin – keyboards 
 Larry Byrom – guitars 
 Jon Goin – guitars 
 Chris Smith – guitars 
 Steve Schaffer – bass 
 Jack Williams – bass
 Kenny Buttrey – drums
 Roger Clark – drums 
 Kenny Malone – drums 
 Terry McMillan – percussion 
 Farrell Morris – percussion 
 Quittman Dennis – saxophone 
 Buddy Skipper – horn arrangements
 Bergen White – string arrangements
 Gary Pigg – backing vocals (4) 
 Marie Tomlinson – backing vocals  (5, 6, 8)
 Barbara Wyrick – backing vocals (5, 6, 8)

Production
 Producer and Engineer – Brown Bannister
 Executive Producer – Michael Blanton
 Recorded at Goldmine Recording Studios (Ventura, CA).
 Mastered by Glenn Meadows at Masterfonics (Nashville, TN).
 Cover Design – Hot Graphics
 Photography – John Miller

David Meece albums
1978 albums